Erro may refer to:

 Erro, Navarre, a municipality in the autonomous community of Navarre, Spain
 Erro (river), a river in north-west Italy
 Erro (crater), a lunar crater named after the astronomer
 "Meu Erro", a song on Os Paralamas do Sucesso's 1984 album O Passo do Lui
 "erro" - also refer to "Root"

People 
 Eric Roberson (born 1976), R&B recording artist and songwriter
 Erró (born 1932), postmodern Icelandic artist
 Luis Enrique Erro (1897–1955), Mexican astronomer
 Enrique Erro, Uruguayan politician

See also
Error (disambiguation)
Err (disambiguation)
ER (disambiguation)